HMS Picotee was a  that served in the Royal Navy. She was built at Harland and Wolff, launched on 21 March 1940 and completed on 5 September 1940. Under the command of Lieutenant R.A. Harrison, she was tasked to convoy escort operations in the North Atlantic. There were no survivors.

References

 Official Website
 HMS Picotee on the Arnold Hague database at convoyweb.org.uk.
 BBC Peoples War – History of H.M.S Picotee: K63

Flower-class corvettes of the Royal Navy
Ships sunk by German submarines in World War II
World War II shipwrecks in the Atlantic Ocean
Maritime incidents in August 1941
1940 ships
Ships lost with all hands
Ships built by Harland and Wolff